Crocus korolkowii  is a species of flowering plant in the genus Crocus of the family Iridaceae. It is a cormous perennial with a native range from central Asia to northern Pakistan.

It is found growing in stony and grassy areas ranging in altitude from 600 to 2600 meters; flowering occurs from February to May.

In cultivation it is easy in a bulb frame but also grown outside in some areas.

References

korolkowii